Miss Ashley II was a custom-built racing aircraft based on the North American P-51 Mustang.

Design and development 
Built by Bill L. Rogers in 1996, Miss Ashley II was a P-51R; a hybrid aircraft consisting of the fuselage of a P-51D fuselage and a P-51H vertical stabilizer, a Learjet 23 wing (without wingtip tanks) and horizontal stabilizer, and Piper Aerostar landing gear.  Power was provided by a 2,455 hp Rolls-Royce Griffon 58 driving two 3-bladed contra-rotating propellers from an Avro Shackleton.

History 
Miss Ashley II made its first flight in the spring of 1997.  The aircraft made its racing debut at the Reno Air Races later that year, piloted by Gary Levitz.  The aircraft carried the race number 38, which was also used by Levitz's original P-51D Miss Ashley and Don Whittington's Griffon-powered P-51XR Mustang, Precious Metal.

1999 Reno Air Races crash 
On September 18, 1999, Miss Ashley II participated in the Unlimited Gold class of the Reno Air Races with Levitz as the pilot.  On the first lap of heat 3A, Miss Ashley II was in fifth place coming around pylon 1 when the aircraft's empennage control surfaces apparently separated from the aircraft.  The nose of the aircraft pitched down and the left wing separated from the fuselage before the aircraft impacted the ground, killing Levitz and completely destroying the aircraft.  The wreckage struck two houses and a travel trailer, though there were no ground casualties.

The National Transportation Safety Board investigated the accident.  A spectator's video reviewed by the NTSB seemed to show that the rudder and vertical stabilizer had separated from the aircraft before the crash, as they were not visible in the video.  However, a video technician noted that this may have been the result of "video smearing", as the video's frame rate may have been too low to accurately capture the rapidly-moving aircraft.  Reconstruction of the empennage wreckage was also inconclusive.  The final NTSB report determined that the probable cause of the accident was flutter causing the empennage and rudder to separate from the aircraft, though the cause of the flutter was not determined.

Miss Ashley II's registration, N57LR, was canceled on August 8, 2002.

See also

References 

North American P-51 Mustang
Racing aircraft
Individual aircraft
Aircraft first flown in 1997
Aircraft with contra-rotating propellers
Low-wing aircraft
Single-engined tractor aircraft